Lamprolopha is a genus of moths of the family Noctuidae. The genus was erected by George Hampson in 1914.

Species
Lamprolopha daloa Hacker, 2019 Ivory Coast
Lamprolopha eupithecica Hacker, 2019 Liberia
Lamprolopha ferruginosa Hacker, 2019 Tanzania
Lamprolopha gigantea Hacker, 2019 Ivory Coast, Nigeria, Gabon
Lamprolopha kononenkoi (Hacker, 2016) Burkina Faso, Tanzania, Yemen
Lamprolopha melanephra Hampson, 1914 Ivory Coast, Liberia, Ghana, Nigeria, Cameroon, Equatorial Guinea, Gabon, Uganda, Kenya, Malawi, Tanzania
Lamprolopha parascotoides Hacker, 2019 Gabon, Guinea
Lamprolopha phaeomicta (Hampson, 1918) Malawi, Tanzania
Lamprolopha rolandi Hacker, 2019 South Africa

References

External links

Acontiinae